Mills Field is a baseball stadium in Brainerd, Minnesota.  It is primarily used for baseball, and was the home field of the Brainerd Lakes Area Lunkers baseball team.  It was built in 1994 and holds 2,500 people.

References

Sports venues in Minnesota
Minor league baseball venues
Buildings and structures in Crow Wing County, Minnesota